Mesembrius is a genus of hoverflies, containing over 50 described species.

Selected species
Subgenus: Mesembrius - Old World tropics
Mesembrius peregrinus (Loew, 1846)

Subgenus: Vadonimyia - Madagascar
Mesembrius discophora Séguy, 1951

References

Diptera of Africa
Insects of Madagascar
Hoverfly genera
Taxa named by Camillo Rondani
Eristalinae